Pseudosphenoptera cocho is a moth in the subfamily Arctiinae. It was described by Schaus in 1896. It is found in Brazil (São Paulo), the upper Amazon and Peru.

References

Gymnelia
Moths described in 1896